Conor Burke (born 23 August 1974) is an Irish former rugby union player.

Career
Burke, a centre, made three appearances for Munster during the 1997–98 Heineken Cup pool stage against Bourgoin, Cardiff and Harlequins, scoring 34 points.

References

External links
Munster Profile

Living people
1974 births
Irish rugby union players
Munster Rugby players
Rugby union centres